Several articles cover topics related to guns in the United States:
 Gun culture in the United States
 Gun law in the United States
 Gun politics in the United States
 Gun violence in the United States